Steven "Lenky" Marsden is a Jamaican-born music producer and musician who specializes primarily in dancehall reggae music. He also arranges and remixes pop and hip hop songs. Marsden is the founder of the Jamaica-based label, 40/40 Records and was a former member of singjay Buju Banton's band.

He is best known for his dancehall riddim Diwali, which had three songs that reached the number one, two, and eleven spots on the Billboard charts featuring the artist Sean Paul, Lumidee (a slightly altered version eventually credited to Marsden), and Wayne Wonder, respectively. He also produced the Masterpiece riddim that became a hit because of Sean Paul's song "Ever Blazin'". He is a satellite member of Sly and Robbie's Taxi label.

Marsden was awarded the 2004 ASCAP songwriter of the year. He was recognized for "Never Leave You (Uh Oooh, Uh Oooh)", "No Letting Go", and "Get Busy", which also won for song of the year.

Partial discography
 1998 Heads Roll riddim
 1999 Keep on Running riddim
 2002 Diwali Riddim/XM 24
 2002 Masterpiece Riddim
 2003 Time Travel Riddim

References

External links
 

Jamaican musicians
Living people
Year of birth missing (living people)